Constantine is a 2005 American superhero horror film directed by Francis Lawrence in his directorial debut. Written by Kevin Brodbin and Frank Cappello, it is loosely based on DC Comics' Hellblazer comic book. The film stars Keanu Reeves as John Constantine, a cynical exorcist with the ability to perceive and communicate with half-angels and half-demons in their true forms and to travel between Earth and Hell. Rachel Weisz, Shia LaBeouf, Tilda Swinton, Pruitt Taylor Vince, Djimon Hounsou, Gavin Rossdale, and Peter Stormare also feature.

Constantine was released theatrically in the United States on February 18, 2005. It grossed $230.9 million worldwide against a production budget between $70–100 million, but met with a mixed reception from film critics. In the following years, it has been considered as a cult film. A sequel is currently in development.

Plot

In Mexico, a scavenger recovers the tip of the spear that pierced Jesus Christ from a ruined church and, after becoming possessed, takes it to Los Angeles. There, cynical occult expert John Constantine exorcises a demon from a young girl after witnessing its attempt to come through her to Earth, something that should be impossible because of a treaty between Heaven and Hell. Suffering from terminal lung cancer, Constantine meets with the half-breed angel Gabriel to request an extension to his life in exchange for his work deporting Hell's forces. Gabriel responds that performing good deeds for selfish reasons will not secure his way into Heaven.

Elsewhere, detective Angela Dodson is investigating the death of her twin sister Isabel who leaped from a psychiatric hospital roof. Angela refuses to believe her sister, a devout Catholic, would commit suicide and condemn herself to Hell. Watching security footage, Angela hears Isabel say "Constantine", and seeks out his assistance. He refuses to help until he witnesses demons pursuing Angela and fends them off. He uses a ritual to see Isabel in Hell and confirms she killed herself. Constantine tells Angela that he committed suicide as a teenager because he was traumatized by seeing supernatural creatures and, though he was revived, when he dies he is condemned to Hell.

At the morgue, Constantine's friend Father Hennesy discovers a symbol on Isabel's wrist but is killed by the half-breed demon Balthazar. Constantine and Angela discover Hennesy carved the symbol into his hand for them to find. Angela also finds a clue hidden in Isabel's hospital room concerning a chapter of Hell's bible. Before being killed by Balthazar, Constantine's ally Beeman tells the pair the symbol represents the antichrist Mammon, Lucifer's son, and the chapter prophesies him usurping his father and conquering the Earth, using a powerful psychic and divine assistance; the psychic, Isabel, killed herself to stop Mammon. Angela reveals she possessed powers like Isabel's but repressed them to avoid being deemed insane like her sister. Constantine helps Angela reawaken her powers by inducing a near-death experience, and she uses them to find Balthazar.

Constantine interrogates Balthazar and learns that the blood of Christ on the spear tip is Mammon's divine assistance, and Angela has been chosen as his new host. An unseen entity destroys Balthazar and abducts Angela who becomes possessed by Mammon. With the help of witch doctor Papa Midnite, Constantine induces visions to locate Angela at the psychiatric hospital. Alongside his driver and apprentice, Chas Kramer, Constantine arms himself and assaults the building, battling through hordes of demons to Angela. Constantine and Chas seemingly exorcise Mammon from her, but Chas is killed by the unseen force, revealed to be Gabriel. Resentful at God's favoritism for humanity and forgiveness for even the most wicked, Gabriel intends to unleash Hell on Earth so that those who survive will become truly "worthy" of His love. Gabriel tosses Constantine away and prepares to pierce Angela with the spear tip to unleash Mammon.

Desperate, Constantine commits suicide by slitting his wrists, knowing that Lucifer will personally come to collect him. Time pauses and Constantine convinces Lucifer to intervene and stop Mammon. Gabriel ineffectually attempts to smite Lucifer, revealing God has abandoned her, and Lucifer burns away Gabriel's wings before banishing Mammon to Hell. Lucifer offers to restore Constantine to life for his assistance, but he instead asks that Isabel be sent to Heaven. Lucifer releases Isabel, but Constantine begins ascending to Heaven for his selfless sacrifice. Infuriated, Lucifer restores Constantine to life and removes his cancer, believing that, in time, he will prove he belongs in Hell. Constantine punches the now-mortal Gabriel before leaving and entrusts Angela with securing the spear tip. In a post-credits scene, Constantine visits Chas's grave and witnesses Chas in an angelic form.

Cast
 Keanu Reeves as John Constantine: A chain-smoking cynic with the ability to perceive the true visage of half-angels and half-demons on the human plane. John believes himself damned to Hell for attempting suicide—a mortal sin—and has terminal lung cancer.
 Connor Dylan Wryn as young John Constantine
 Quinn Buniel as child John Constantine
 Rachel Weisz as Angela Dodson: A troubled LAPD detective investigating the suicide of her twin sister Isabel (also portrayed by Weisz). 
 Weisz also portrays Mammon, the son of Lucifer who has no patience for his father's rule of Hell and uses Angela's body as a means of escaping to rule over Earth.
 Shia LaBeouf as Chas Kramer: Constantine's driver and apprentice. Chas has a strong interest in the occult and helps Constantine whenever possible in order to gain knowledge and experience from him.
 Tilda Swinton as Gabriel: A "half-breed" Archangel with a disdain for humanity who plots to free Mammon as a means to unleash Hell on the Earth.
 Pruitt Taylor Vince as Father Hennessy: An insomniac, alcoholic priest with the ability to communicate with the dead. He wears a protective charm in order to "keep the voices out".
 Djimon Hounsou as Papa Midnite: A former witch-doctor who once fought against Hell. After swearing an oath of neutrality—unless one side should tip the balance of power—he opened a nightclub to serve as neutral meeting ground for both sides of the war between Heaven and Hell.
 Gavin Rossdale as Balthazar: A "half-breed" demon with a special interest in, and personal history with, Constantine.
 Peter Stormare as Satan/Lucifer: A fallen Archangel who is in a proxy war with God for the souls of all mankind and ruler of Hell, feared on Earth as Satan or The Devil. Lucifer loathes Constantine with such vigor that Constantine's soul is the only one he would ever come to personally collect.
 Max Baker as Beeman: A friend of Constantine's with extensive knowledge of exotic occult materials and insects. He supplies Constantine with both holy objects and information.
 Francis Guinan as Father Garret: A priest Angela talks to about getting Isabel a Catholic burial.
 José Zúñiga as Det. Weiss: Angela's partner.
 Jesse Ramirez as Manuel: A scavenger and treasure hunter who finds the Spear of Destiny in the ruins of a church in Mexico that grants various powers and places him in a trance-like state in which he travels to Los Angeles.
 April Grace as Dr. Archer: Constantine's doctor.
 Tanoai Reed as the bouncer at Midnite's club.

Additionally, Michelle Monaghan filmed several scenes as Ellie: A half-breed demon Constantine sleeps with and asks for information, who is based on a succubus of the same name in the Hellblazer comics. In the finished film, however, the role consists of two brief shots and one line of dialogue ("Holy water?") during Constantine's climactic confrontation with the group of half-breeds in the hospital. Director Francis Lawrence said Ellie's relationship with Constantine was cut to make him more of a lonely character.

Production
The character of John Constantine was introduced by comic book writer/creator Alan Moore in The Saga of Swamp Thing #37, released in June 1985. In 1988, the character was given his own comic book title, Hellblazer, published by DC Comics.

Producer Lauren Shuler Donner began developing the film in 1997. Paul Hunter was attached to direct in 1999, and he was replaced by Tarsem Singh in 2001. Warner Bros. hoped to begin filming in 2002 with Nicolas Cage in the lead role, but Singh dropped out, resulting in opposing lawsuits filed by himself and Warner Bros. Keanu Reeves became attached to the film in 2002. Alan Moore, the original creator of John Constantine, had been disappointed by the previous adaptations of his comics From Hell and The League of Extraordinary Gentlemen, and refused to be credited or associated with this film, asking that his royalties be distributed among the other creators of the character.

Constantine incorporated some elements of Garth Ennis's "Dangerous Habits" story arc from the comic (issues #41–46), and others, such as the inclusion of Papa Midnite, from the Original Sins trade paperback. The film's title was changed from Hellblazer to Constantine to avoid confusion with Clive Barker's Hellraiser films. In fact, the comics series was originally going to be titled Hellraiser, but was also retitled to avoid confusion with the first Hellraiser film, which was released a year before the debut of Hellblazer.

The film changed several aspects of the source material. For one, it was set in Los Angeles, rather than England, which director Francis Lawrence justified by claiming that the comic book was not exclusively set in London. Reeves played the role of John Constantine with his real-life American accent and black hair, while the character in the comics was drawn to resemble the blond musician Sting and came from Liverpool. For the film, Constantine was also given the psychic ability to see "half-breeds" as they truly are, and this led him to attempt suicide, causing his damnation, which, in the comics, was punishment for summoning a demon that killed a young girl. Additionally, the resolution of the lung cancer plotline in the film was amended so that Lucifer willingly saves the redeemed Constantine to give him a second chance at falling, rather than being tricked into doing so.

Director Lawrence decided to base the film's conception of Hell "on the geography of what's around us now." He further explained:

Music

Soundtrack

Constantine: Original Motion Picture Soundtrack was released on February 15, 2005. It is an orchestral compilation of songs from the film, performed by The Hollywood Studio Symphony & The Hollywood Film Chorale and composed by Brian Tyler, the composer for films such as Eagle Eye and Fast & Furious, and Klaus Badelt. Two songs heard in the film, "Passive" by A Perfect Circle (heard as Constantine walks through Midnite's bar) and "Take Five" by The Dave Brubeck Quartet (heard on a record played by Constantine), were not included on the soundtrack.

The album was panned by Allmusic, who referred to it as "clichéd and religiously formulaic".

Instrumentation

 Strings: 47 violins, 27 violas, 27 violoncellos, 17 double basses, 1 harp
 Woodwinds: 7 flutes, 4 clarinets, 2 bassoons
 Brass: 12 horns, 3 trumpets, 6 trombones, 2 tubas
 Percussion: 8 players
 Keyboard: 3 players
 Chorus: 11 sopranos, 10 altos, 8 tenors, 8 baritones/bass

Release

Theatrical
The original announced release date for the film was September 17, 2004, but it was subsequently pushed back to February 2005. Although the film was intended to be rated PG-13, it received an R-rating from the MPAA, which Lawrence attributed to its religious overtones.

Home media
The film was released on VHS and DVD in 2005. Warner Home Video announced it would be released on HD DVD on March 28, 2006, making it one of the earliest titles released on that media format, but, following delays to the launch of HD DVD, it actually debuted on HD DVD on June 6, 2006. It was released on Blu-ray Disc by Warner Home Video on October 14, 2008.

Reception

Box office
Constantine opened in 3,006 theaters in the United States on February 18, 2005, earning $29.8 million in its opening weekend and ranking second behind Hitch's second weekend. It ended its run on June 16, having grossed $76 million in the United States and Canada, and $154.9 million in other territories, for a worldwide total of $230.9 million, against a production budget of $70–100 million.

Critical response
On Metacritic, which assigns a weighted average, it has a score of 50 out of 100 based on the reviews of 41 critics, indicating "mixed or average reviews". Audiences polled by CinemaScore gave the film an average grade of "B" on an A+ to F scale.

Richard Corliss of Time magazine called the film "a one-of-a-kind hybrid: a theological noir action film". He cited Keanu Reeves' ability to "retain his charisma in [a] weird-silly moment" as proof that he is a "movie star", and referred to Tilda Swinton as "immaculately decadent". Corliss also praised the variety of camera placements employed by Francis Lawrence. He was, however, critical of the climax of the film, referring to it as "irrevocably goofy".

Ella Taylor of LA Weekly wrote: "Constantine, which opts in the end for what I can only describe as a kind of supernatural humanism, is not without its spiritual satisfactions." Carina Chocano of the Los Angeles Times said that "Keanu Reeves has no peer when it comes to playing these sort of messianic roles—he infuses them with a Zen blankness and serenity that somehow gets him through even the unlikeliest scenes with a quiet, unassuming dignity."

Pete Vonder Haar of Film Threat gave the film three stars out of five, writing that "the film (barely) succeeds, thanks to impressive visuals, the idea of an uncaring God wagering with Satan for souls, and two immensely enjoyable scenes (one with Weisz, one with Stormare) in which Reeves actually plays his character as the cynical asshole he really is."

Jack Mathews of the New York Daily News gave the film 2 out of 4 stars, stating: "For all its spiritual angst, Constantine is about as silly as fantasies get." Michael Sragow of The Baltimore Sun also gave the film 2 stars out of 4, saying: "It all comes off as a case of filmmakers wanting to have their communion wafer and eat it, too." Desson Thomson, a writer for The Washington Post, had similar sentiments of the film, specifically criticizing its differences from the comic book:

Leonard Maltin's annual publication Movie Guide gave the film a BOMB rating, describing it as "dreary, to put it mildly".
Film critic Roger Ebert gave it 1.5 out of 4 stars, panning the depiction of Hell ("a post-nuclear Los Angeles created by animators with a hangover"), the premise of the film itself ("You would think that God would be the New England Patriots of this contest, but apparently there is a chance that Satan could win."), plot holes, inconsistencies, and general actions depicted throughout the film. He was not particularly critical of the acting, only mentioning it by stating: "Reeves has a deliberately morose energy level in the movie, as befits one who has seen Hell, walks among half-demons, and is dying. He keeps on smoking." Ebert added the film to his list of "most hated" films.

Novelization and video game
To tie-in to the film's release, a novelization by John Shirley and a video game adaption were produced. The novelization states that the buildings in Hell are built with the souls of the damned, rather than brick, and lined with blood, rather than mortar.

Sequel
In 2011, director Francis Lawrence stated, regarding a sequel:

It was announced in November 2012 that Guillermo del Toro had signed a deal to write and direct a Justice League Dark film centered around DC Comics' supernatural characters, John Constantine among them.

Reeves stated in May 2019 that he is open to reprising the role in the future.

In November 2020, Stormare announced in a post on Instagram that a sequel was "in the works", though neither representatives for Warner Bros. nor Reeves immediately responded to requests for comment.

Reeves again expressed interest in a sequel in December 2021, saying: "I would love to be John Constantine again."
 	
In September 2022, Deadline reported that Warner Bros. will develop a Constantine sequel, with Keanu Reeves set to return in the lead role. Francis Lawrence will return as the film's director, with Akiva Goldsman writing the screenplay. Goldsman will also produce, alongside J. J. Abrams & Hannah Minghella.

References

External links

 
 
 
 

2005 films
2000s action horror films
2005 fantasy films
2000s superhero films
2000s monster movies
American fantasy action films
American superhero films
2000s English-language films
American action horror films
Apocalyptic films
Demons in film
Films about angels
Films about cancer
Films about exorcism
Films about immunity
Films about smoking
Films about suicide
Live-action films based on DC Comics
Films based on works by Alan Moore
Films set in 2005
Films set in Los Angeles
Films shot in California
Films set in hell
Hellblazer
Religious horror films
Superhero horror films
The Devil in film
Di Bonaventura Pictures films
Village Roadshow Pictures films
Warner Bros. films
Films scored by Klaus Badelt
Films scored by Brian Tyler
Films directed by Francis Lawrence
Films produced by Lauren Shuler Donner
Films produced by Lorenzo di Bonaventura
Films produced by Akiva Goldsman
American supernatural horror films
Supernatural fantasy films
Supernatural action films
American dark fantasy films
American vigilante films
Films adapted into comics
2005 directorial debut films
2000s American films
Angels in popular culture